Óscar Sánchez Fuentes (born 19 December 1979) is a Spanish retired professional footballer who played usually as a left-back, currently manager of Orihuela CF.

Playing career
Sánchez was born in Murcia. After stints with Atlético Madrid's C and B teams and Segunda División side CD Badajoz, he joined Real Valladolid in 2002, where he was regularly used as a defensive backup. He made his La Liga debut on 28 September 2002, playing three minutes in a 1–1 home draw against Real Madrid.

Sánchez helped Valladolid to achieve top-flight promotion in the 2006–07 season, participating in 21 league matches (1,262 minutes) the following campaign. After seven years of relative use, he signed for hometown club Real Murcia on a free transfer, appearing in less than half of the games in his first year as his team suffered relegation from the second tier but being first-choice in the following in an immediate promotion.

On 22 October 2011, Sánchez scored a brace in a 3–1 home win against Villarreal CF B. He scored a career-best seven goals that season, helping Murcia to narrowly escape relegation.

Coaching career
After retiring at the age of 34, Sánchez was assistant manager in several teams under José Manuel Aira; at Real Murcia, he was second-in-command to both Aira and Vicente Mir. For a brief period of time, he also worked as that club's director of football. 

On 17 November 2021, Sánchez was named head coach of Orihuela CF in the Tercera Federación.

Honours
Valladolid
Segunda División: 2006–07

Murcia
Segunda División B: 2010–11

References

External links

1979 births
Living people
Spanish footballers
Footballers from Murcia
Association football defenders
La Liga players
Segunda División players
Segunda División B players
Atlético Madrid C players
Atlético Madrid B players
Real Jaén footballers
CD Badajoz players
Real Valladolid players
Real Murcia players
Spanish football managers
Tercera Federación managers
Spanish expatriate sportspeople in France